Jean-Henri Casimir Fabre (21 December 1823 – 11 October 1915) was a French naturalist, entomologist, and author known for the lively style of his popular books on the lives of insects.

Biography
Fabre was born on 21 December 1823 in Saint-Léons in Aveyron, France.
Fabre was largely an autodidact, owing to the poverty of his family. Nevertheless, he acquired a primary teaching certificate at the young age of 19 and began teaching in Carpentras whilst pursuing further studies. In 1849, he was appointed to a teaching post in Ajaccio (Corsica), then in 1853 moved on to the lycée in Avignon.

Fabre was a popular teacher, physicist, chemist and botanist. However, he is probably best known for his findings in the field of entomology, the study of insects, and is considered by many to be the father of modern entomology. Much of his enduring popularity is due to his marvellous teaching ability and his manner of writing about the lives of insects in biographical form, which he preferred to a clinically detached, journalistic mode of recording.  In doing so he combined what he called "my passion for scientific truth" with keen observations and an engaging, colloquial style of writing. Fabre (translated) wrote:

His Souvenirs Entomologiques is a series of texts on insects and arachnids. He influenced the later writings of Charles Darwin, who called Fabre "an inimitable observer". Fabre, however, was a Christian who remained sceptical about Darwin's theory of evolution, as he always held back from all theories and systems. His special force was exact and detailed observation, field research, always avoiding general conclusions from his observations, which he considered premature.

In one of Fabre's most famous experiments, he arranged pine processionary caterpillars to form a continuous loop around the edge of a pot. As each caterpillar instinctively followed the silken trail of the caterpillars in front of it, the group moved around in a circle for seven days. He further was able to forecast low atmospheric pressure events by observing the behaviours of the caterpillars.

He died on 11 October 1915.  
In the English speaking world, he became known through the extensive translations of his work by Alexander Teixeira de Mattos, carried out from 1912 to 1922.

Works

 Scène de la vie des insectes
 Chimie agricole (textbook) (1862)
 La Terre (1865)
 Le Ciel (textbook) (1867) - Scanned text on Gallica
 Le livre d’histoires, récits scientifiques de l’oncle Paul à ses neveux. Lectures courantes pour toutes les écoles (textbook) (1869) - High definition PDF file  
 Catalogue des « Insectes Coléoptères observés aux environs d'Avignon » (1870)
 Les Ravageurs (1870)
 Les Auxiliaires, récits de l’oncle Paul sur les animaux utiles à l’agriculture (1873) High definition PDF file  
 Aurore (textbook) (1874) Scanned text on Gallica
 Botanique (textbook) (1874)
 L'Industrie (textbook) (1875)
 Les Serviteurs (textbook) (1875)
 Sphériacées du Vaucluse (1878)
 Souvenirs entomologiques – 1st series (1879) – Scanned text on Gallica
 Etude sur les moeurs des Halictes (1879)
 Le Livre des Champs (1879)
 Lectures sur la Botanique (1881)
 Nouveaux souvenirs entomologiques – 2nd series (1882) – Scanned text on Gallica
 Lectures sur la Zoologie (1882)
 Zoologie (textbook) (1884)
 Souvenirs entomologiques – 3rd series (1886) – Scanned text on Gallica
 Histoire naturelles (textbook) (1889)
 Souvenirs entomologiques – 4th series (1891) – Scanned text on Gallica
 La plante : leçons à mon fils sur la botanique (livre scolaire) (1892) – Scanned text on Gallica
 Souvenirs entomologiques – 5th series (1897) – Scanned text on Gallica
 Souvenirs entomologiques – 6th series (1900) – Scanned text on Gallica
 Souvenirs entomologiques – 7th series (1901) – Scanned text on Gallica
 Souvenirs entomologiques – 8th series (1903)
 Souvenirs entomologiques – 9th series (1905)
 Souvenirs entomologiques – 10th series (1909)
 Fabre's Book of Insects retold from Alexander Teixeira de Mattos' translation of Fabre's Souvenirs entomologiques Scanned book
 Oubreto Provençalo dou Felibre di Tavan (1909)  Text on Jean-Henri Fabre, e-museum
 La Vie des insectes (1910)
 Mœurs des insectes (1911)
 Les Merveilles de l'instinct chez les insectes (1913)
 Le monde merveilleux des insectes (1921)
 Poésie françaises et provençales (1925) (final edition)
 La Vie des araignées (1928)
 Bramble-Bees and Others Scanned book, Project Gutenberg full text
 The Life of the Grasshopper. Dodd, Mead, and company, 1917. ASIN B00085HYR4
 Insect Adventures. Dodd, Mead, 1917. Selections from Alexander Teixeira de Mattos' translation of Fabre's Souvenirs entomologiques, retold for young people.
 The Life of the Caterpillar. Dodd, Mead, 1919. ASIN B00089FB2A
 Field, Forest, and Farm: Things interesting to young nature lovers, including some matters of moment to gardeners and fruit-growers. The Century Company, 1919. ASIN B00085PDU4 Full text
 This Earth of Ours: Talks about Mountains and Rivers, Volcanoes, Earthquakes, and Geysers & Other Things. Albert & Charles Boni, 1923. ASIN B000EHLE22
 The Life of The Scorpion. University Press of the Pacific, 2002 (reprinted from the 1923 edition). 
 The Glow-Worm and Other Beetles. Dodd, Mead, 1919. ASIN B000882F2K
 The Mason Bees (Translated) Garden City, 1925.  ASIN B00086XXU0; Reprinted in 2004 by Kessinger Publishing; ;  Scanned book, Project Gutenberg full text
 Curiosities of Science. The Century Company, 1927. ASIN B00086KVBE
 The Insect World of J. Henri Fabre.  Introduction and Interpretive Comments by Edwin Way Teale; foreword to 1991 edition by Gerald Durrell.  Published by Dodd, Mead in 1949; Reprinted by Beacon Press in 1991; 
 The Life of the Spider (1912) (Translated) preface by Maurice Maeterlinck Scanned book, Wikisource full text
 The Life of the Fly. (Translated) Fredonia Books, 2001. ;  Scanned book
 The Hunting Wasps. University Press of the Pacific, 2002. ; 
 More Hunting Wasps Scanned book Project Gutenberg full text
 The Wonders of Instinct: Chapters in the Psychology of Insects. University Press of the Pacific, 2002. ;  Scanned book, Project Gutenberg full text
 Social Life in the Insect World Scanned book, Project Gutenberg full text
 Insect life Scanned book

Legacy
The site of his birth, at St Léons, near Millau is now the site of Micropolis, a tourist attraction dedicated to popularising entomology and a museum on his life.

His last home and office, the Harmas de Fabre in Provence is similarly a museum devoted to his life and work. His insect collection is preserved in the Musée Requien in Avignon. 

The French post office commemorated Fabre in 1956 with a stamp depicting a portrait of him.

The 1951 biographical film Monsieur Fabre is devoted to his life.

Blood of the Mantis, a 2009 fantasy novel by the British author Adrian Tchaikovsky is dedicated to Fabre.

Fabre appears as the only major human character in a Caper story parody set on his property in Matthew Bennardo's short story "The Famous Fabre Fly Caper".

References

Biographies
 G.V. Legros, (Bernard Miall, translator), Fabre, Poet of Science. T. Fisher Unwin, 1913. (Reprinted by University Press of the Pacific, 2002,) Scanned book
 E.L. Bouvier, "The Life and Work of J.H. Fabre". Annual Report of the Smithsonian Institution, 1916, pages 587–597.
 Augustin Fabre, The Life of Jean Henri Fabre. Dodd, Mead, 1921. Scanned version on the Internet Archive
 Percy F. Bicknell, The Human Side of Fabre. The Century Company, 1923.
 Eleanor Doorly, The Insect Man, William Heinemann, 1936

External links

 
 
 
Jean-Henri Fabre: e-museum
The Amazing World of the Insects of Jean-Henri Fabre
Micropolis In English
The museum and birth house of Jean-Henri Fabre In French

1823 births
1915 deaths
French entomologists
French Roman Catholics
19th-century French writers
20th-century French non-fiction writers
19th-century French male writers
Insects in culture
20th-century French male writers
Fabre